The 1916 Saint Louis Billikens football team was an American football team that represented Saint Louis University during the 1916 college football season. In their first and only season under head coach Earl H. Painter, the Billikens compiled a 4–4 record and outscored opponents by a total of 157 to 126. The team played its home games at Robison Field at St. Louis.

Schedule

References

Saint Louis
Saint Louis Billikens football seasons
Saint Louis Billikens football